The Sancak-ı Şerif is the alleged original standard of the Prophet Muhammad. It is currently kept along with other sacred relics of Muhammad in the treasury of the Topkapı Palace in Istanbul.

According to legend, the flag was used in the first Muslim wars; then passed into the hands of the Umayyads and Abbasids; and finally, with Selim I's conquest of Egypt in 1517, fell into Ottoman hands. The Ottomans carried the flag into battle, beginning with their Hungarian campaign circa 1593.

According to Ottoman historian Silahdar Findiklili Mehmed Agha (d. 1727), the flag was made of black wool.

It was believed that if the Ottoman state, or Islam generally, were threatened with extreme danger, the flag should be taken into the field by the sultan personally, whereupon every Muslim capable of taking arms must rally under the flag.

See also
Black Standard
Relics of Muhammad

References

Historical flags
Islamic religious objects
Possessions of Muhammad
Relics
Religious flags
Topkapı Palace